Beth Israel Synagogue is a Conservative synagogue located at 920 Franklin Road in Roanoke, Virginia. The synagogue was founded in 1900, and as of 2009, it had a membership of approximately 160 families and individuals.

In 2007 the synagogue completed an expansion and renovation of its building, carefully planned so that the original facade, part of Roanoke's Old Southwest historic district, was unaltered. Fabian Werbin joined as rabbi in 2008.

Resources

 Beth Israel Synagogue: 100th Anniversary 1902-2002, Published by Beth Israel Synagogue, (Roanoke, Va.,) 2001

Notes

19th-century synagogues
Jewish organizations established in 1900
Roanoke, Virginia
Greek Revival synagogues
Greek Revival architecture in Virginia
Conservative synagogues in Virginia
Buildings and structures in Roanoke, Virginia